Cándida Estefany Arias Pérez (born March 11, 1992 in Yaguate, San Cristóbal) is a volleyball player from the Dominican Republic, who won the bronze medal with her native country at the 2008 NORCECA Girls' U18 Volleyball Continental Championship in Guaynabo, Puerto Rico wearing the number 15 jersey.

Career

She debuted with her senior national team in June 2009, at the 2010 World Championship NORCECA Qualification Pool H, at Santiago de los Caballeros, Dominican Republic, helping her team to qualify to the world event.

With her U-18 team she won the 11th place at the 2009 Girls Youth Volleyball World Championship held in Nakhon Ratchasima, Thailand, and shortly afterwards, won the silver medal with the National Junior Team at the 2009 Women's U20 Volleyball World Championship.

Arias played in Chiapas, Mexico, with her National Senior Team, helping her team to win the 2010 Final Four Cup gold medal.

In June 2011, Arias played with her National Junior Team at the U-20 Pan-American Cup, held in Peru. There Arias win the "Best Blocker" award while her team won the silver medal.

The Peruvian team San Martín de Porres signed Arias for the second leg of the 2012 season, as her first international club experience.

In September 2012, Arias won the gold medal and the Best Blocker award at the first 2012 U23 Pan-American Cup, played in Callao, Peru. Arias won the 2013 NORCECA Championship Best Middle Blocker award.

Clubs
 San Cristóbal (2007)
 Santo Domingo (2008)
 San Cristóbal (2008)
 Madre Vieja (2009)
 Mirador (2010-2011)
 Universidad San Martín (2011-2013)
 Primorotchka (2013-2014)

Awards

Individuals
 2007 Dominican Volleyball League "Best Blocker"
 2011 Junior Pan-American Cup "Best Blocker"
 2012 Copa Latina "Best Blocker"
 2011-12 Liga Nacional Superior de Voleibol "Best Blocker"
 2012 U23 Pan-American Cup "Best Blocker"
 2013 NORCECA Championship "Best Middle Blocker"
 2014 Pan-American Cup "Best Middle Blocker"

National Team

Senior Team
 2009 FIVB World Grand Champions Cup -  Bronze Medal
 2009 NORCECA Championship -  Gold Medal
 2009 Final Four Women's Cup -  Bronze Medal
 2010 Final Four Women's Cup -  Gold Medal
 2010 Pan-American Cup -  Gold Medal

Junior Team
 2009 FIVB U20 Volleyball World Championship -  Silver Medal
 2008 NORCECA Girls Youth Continental Championship U-18 -  Bronze Medal
 2011 Junior Pan-American Cup -  Silver Medal
 2012 U23 Pan-American Cup -  Gold Medal

Clubs
 Dominican Republic Distrito Nacional Superior Tournament 2006 -  Champion, with  Mirador
 Dominican Republic Volleyball League 2008 -  Runner-Up, with San Cristóbal
 2011–12 Peruvian League -  Runner-Up, with Universidad San Martín
 2012–13 Peruvian League -  Runner-Up, with Universidad San Martín

References

External links
 FIVB Profile 
 Dominican Republic National Volleyball Federation

1992 births
Living people
People from Yaguate
Dominican Republic women's volleyball players
Volleyball players at the 2012 Summer Olympics
Olympic volleyball players of the Dominican Republic
Central American and Caribbean Games gold medalists for the Dominican Republic
Competitors at the 2014 Central American and Caribbean Games
Middle blockers
Dominican Republic expatriates in Peru
Expatriate volleyball players in Russia
Expatriate volleyball players in Peru
Pan American Games medalists in volleyball
Pan American Games gold medalists for the Dominican Republic
Volleyball players at the 2019 Pan American Games
Central American and Caribbean Games medalists in volleyball
Medalists at the 2019 Pan American Games